Pleuger Industries is a German manufacturer of submersible pumps, thrusters, and plunger pumps. It is based in Hamburg, Germany. The word "Pleuger" is sometimes considered as synonymous for water-filled motors with multi-stage pumps. It is also considered as the pioneer of submersible turbine pump motor.

Since being acquired by the investment company, Flacks Group, in 2018, Pleuger is operating as an independent company.

Its products are used internationally in the energy industry, mining, the oil and gas industry, the renewable energy, and the water market sector. Throughout its history, its pumps have been used in various applications around the world, including at the Moutoa Floodway, Alster fountain, Collahuasi mine, and Montpellier.

Company development

Pleuger Industries was founded in 1929 by Friedrich Wilhelm Pleuger, when he invented glandless motor as a replacement to the borehole shaft and piston pumps. Since water was used to lubricate and cool the bearings of the wet rotor motor, the patent was regarded particularly ecologically benign and effective at the time. In contrast to oil-filled submersible motors of the time, Pleuger pumps had the critical benefit that they could be employed in sensitive sectors such as drinking water delivery. In the 1930s, these pumps became the universally accepted standard.

In 1930, during the expansion of Berlin subway system, Pleuger installed directly coupled water-filled submersible motors. The pumps helped lower the groundwater for the construction project.

In 1945, during the World War II, Pleuger plants in Berlin and Greitz were damaged or destroyed. After the war, Friedrich Wilhelm Pleuger restarted the work in a minor repair workshop in Hamburg-Altona. 

In 1951, a new plant was established Wandsbek, Hamburg and subsequently its headquarters were relocated there. In the 1970s, Pleuger Industries partnered with an American company, TRW, to expand in new regions, develop and exchange new products and technologies.

In 1987, Dresser Industries acquired Pleuger from TRW. The acquisition of Pleuger helped Dresser to expand its submersible pumps in drainage, irrigation, and offshore applications.

In 1989, Pleuger Worthington was formed after a merger between Dresser Pleuger GmbH and Deutsch Worthington.

In 1992, it became part of the Ingersoll-Dresser Pump (IDP).

In 2000, the ownership of Pleuger when it was acquired by Flowserve.

In November 2013, Pleuger introduced Pleuger PMM6, a submersible pump made from permanent magnets and was ten percent more efficient than its predecessor.

In February 2016, the company launched Pleuger PMM8 submersible electric motor that works with variable frequency drives.

In 2018, Flacks Group acquired Pleuger from Flowserve. Previously, when it was part of Flowserve, it was known as Flowserve Pleuger.

In 2019, Pleuger established a subsidiary in Moscow, Russia.

In 2020, Pleuger expanded its operations and opened a subsidiary in Singapore.

In 2021, the company redeveloped its subsidiary brand, Aldrich.

In 2022, Pleuger closed its Russian subsidiary and established its headquarters in Miami.

Alster fountain

Since the 1980s, Pleuger pumps are installed in the Alsterfontäne, a fountain that has an output of 70 kW and can pump 180,000 liters of water per hour to a height of up to 60 meters. For the pump, permanent magnet technology (PMM) drive has been used, installed in 2018. Pumps were first installed by Pleuger for free in 1982 when the foundation was established. Pleuger also provides annual maintenance in partnership with the Binnenalster Foundation.

See also
 Pleuger rudder, a rudder named after Pleuger

References

1929 establishments in Germany
Pump manufacturers
Companies based in Hamburg